Coulanges is a former commune in the Loir-et-Cher department of central France. On 1 January 2017, it was merged into the new commune Valloire-sur-Cisse.

Population

See also
Communes of the Loir-et-Cher department

References

Former communes of Loir-et-Cher